Terrence Keith McDaniel (born December 6, 1966) is an American former Major League Baseball outfielder.

McDaniel graduated from Southeast High School in Kansas City, Missouri in 1985 and attended Houston on a college football scholarship but dropped out after one year to pursue a professional baseball career.

He played during one season at the major league level for the New York Mets. He was drafted by the Mets in the 6th round of the 1986 amateur draft. McDaniel played his first professional season with their Rookie league Kingsport Mets in 1986, and his split his last season with the Cincinnati Reds' Double-A Chattanooga Lookouts and Triple-A Nashville Sounds in 1992.

References

External links

1966 births
Living people
New York Mets players
Nashville Sounds players
Major League Baseball outfielders
Baseball players from Kansas City, Missouri
Albany Diamond Dogs players
Brainerd Bears players
Chattanooga Lookouts players
Columbia Mets players
Jackson Mets players
Kingsport Mets players
Little Falls Mets players
St. Lucie Mets players
Tidewater Tides players
African-American baseball players